Nyctemera warmasina is a moth of the family Erebidae first described by George Thomas Bethune-Baker in 1910. It is found on New Guinea.

References

Nyctemerina
Moths described in 1910